Similitude is a concept applicable to the testing of engineering models.

Similitude may also refer to:

 "Similitude" (Star Trek: Enterprise), an episode from the television series Star Trek: Enterprise
 Similarity (geometry)